Lindy Miller (born July 6, 1956) is an American professional golfer who has played on the PGA Tour, Ben Hogan Tour, and Champions Tour.

Miller was born, raised and has lived most of his life in Fort Worth, Texas. During his teens, he won the 1973 Fort Worth Junior Golf Association Championship. Miller attended Oklahoma State University and was a distinguished member of the golf team — an All-American for all four years (1975–1978), a first-team All-American his last three years and winner of the Haskins Award in 1978. Miller's college teammates included future PGA Tour Champions David Edwards and Bob Tway. Miller and Edwards led the Cowboys to victory at the 1976 and 1978 NCAA Championships. At the 1978 Masters, Miller posted a two-under-par 286 – the lowest total for an amateur since 1961. He turned professional in 1978.

Miller played on both the PGA and Ben Hogan Tours during his regular career years. He won the 1990 Ben Hogan Amarillo Open. His best finish on the PGA Tour was second at the 1979 Tallahassee Open and his best finish in a major was a T-16 at The Masters in 1978. After retiring as a touring professional, he became director of golf at Fort Worth's Mira Vista Golf Club. In 1988, Miller played himself in the film, Dead Solid Perfect, which followed the life of a professional golfer on the PGA Tour.

At the 2007 North Texas PGA Senior Championship, Miller shot a competitive course record 63 in the final round on his way to winning the tournament.

Amateur wins
this list is incomplete
1973 Fort Worth Junior Golf Association Championship
1977 Southern Amateur, Pacific Coast Amateur

Professional wins (7)

Ben Hogan Tour wins (1)

Other wins (5)
1978 Oklahoma Open
1986 Oklahoma Open, Northern Texas PGA Championship
1992 Northern Texas PGA Championship
2006 Northern Texas PGA Championship

Senior wins (1)
2007 FINA North Texas PGA Seniors' Championship

Results in major championships

Note: Miller never played in The Open Championship.

LA = low amateur
CUT = missed the half-way cut
"T" indicates a tie for a place

U.S. national team appearances
Amateur
Walker Cup: 1977 (winners)

See also
Fall 1978 PGA Tour Qualifying School graduates
1982 PGA Tour Qualifying School graduates

References

External links

American male golfers
Oklahoma State Cowboys golfers
PGA Tour golfers
PGA Tour Champions golfers
Golfers from Texas
Sportspeople from Fort Worth, Texas
1956 births
Living people